Gaohu is a town of Jing'an County in northwestern Jiangxi province, China, located  northwest of the county seat. , it has one residential community, 7 villages, and a forest area under its administration.

See also 
 List of township-level divisions of Jiangxi

References 

Township-level divisions of Jiangxi
Jing'an County